Saurita lacteipars is a moth in the subfamily Arctiinae. It was described by Paul Dognin in 1914. It is found in Colombia and Venezuela.

References

Natural History Museum Lepidoptera generic names catalog

Moths described in 1914
Saurita